The 2018 Alaska gubernatorial election took place on November 6, 2018, to elect the governor and lieutenant governor of Alaska. In the primaries for recognized political parties, candidates for governor and lieutenant governor run separately. The winners of each respective primary for governor and lieutenant governor then become a joint ticket in the general election for their political party. Incumbent independent governor Bill Walker was running for re-election in what was originally a three-way race between Walker, Republican nominee Mike Dunleavy, a former State Senator, and Democratic nominee Mark Begich, a former U.S. Senator. However, Walker dropped out on October 19, 2018, and endorsed Begich. In spite of Walker dropping out, Dunleavy defeated Begich in what would become the only gubernatorial gain by a Republican candidate in 2018. As of 2023, this is the last election in which the Governor’s office in Alaska changed partisan control.

Independent candidates for governor and lieutenant governor may form a ticket that will appear on the general election ballot, provided that both candidates on the ticket collect enough valid petition signatures, as mandated by the Alaska Division of Elections.

Democratic–Libertarian–Independence primary
Candidates from the Alaska Democratic Party, Alaska Libertarian Party and Alaskan Independence Party appear on the same ballot, with the highest-placed candidate from each party receiving that party's nomination. In October 2017 the AKDP sued for the right to allow non-Democrats to compete for and win the Democratic nomination, which was ultimately decided in their favor in April 2018. This move was widely thought to benefit incumbent Gov. Bill Walker, to foreclose the possibility of a Democratic nominee splitting the vote with Walker against a Republican nominee. However, with the entry of former senator Mark Begich into the race, Walker withdrew from the Democratic primary and forged ahead with a fully independent bid for reelection.

Governor

Declared 

 Mark Begich (Democratic), former U.S. Senator
 William S. "Billy" Toien (Libertarian), Libertarian candidate for Alaska Governor in 2010

Polling 

with Mark Begich

Endorsements

Results

Lieutenant governor

Declared 

 Debra Call (Democratic), Cook Inlet Tribal Council Board of Directors Representative

Withdrawn 

 Edgar Blatchford (Democratic), former mayor of Seward

Results

Republican primary

Governor

Nominated
 Mike Dunleavy, educator and former state senator

Eliminated in primary 
 Dorian Colbry
 Thomas A. "Tom" Gordon
Gerald Heikes, perennial candidate
Merica Hlatcu
Michael Sheldon
Mead Treadwell, former lieutenant governor

Withdrawn 

 Mike Chenault, state representative and former Speaker of the Alaska House of Representatives
 Scott Hawkins, businessman

Declined 

 Bill Walker, incumbent Independent Governor (running for re-election as an Independent)
 Robert Gillam, businessman
 Loren Leman, former lieutenant governor
 Anna MacKinnon, state senator (endorsed Mike Dunleavy)
 Joe Miller, former magistrate judge and perennial candidate
 Sean Parnell, former governor of Alaska (endorsed Mike Dunleavy)
Frank Murkowski, former governor of Alaska and U.S. Senator
 Peter Micciche, state senator (running for re-election to state senate)
 Dan Sullivan, former mayor of Anchorage and nominee for lieutenant governor in 2014 (endorsed Mike Dunleavy)
 Ben Stevens, former President of the Alaska State Senate, son of former President pro tempore of the U.S. Senate, Solicitor of the Interior Department & U.S. Attorney Ted Stevens

Endorsements

Polling

Results

Lieutenant governor

Declared 

 Lynn Gattis, former state representative and candidate for the state senate in 2016
 Edie Grunwald, retired air force colonel and former human resources director for the Alaska National Guard
 Sharon Jackson, activist and former congressional staffer
 Kevin Meyer, state senator and former president of the Alaska Senate
 Gary Stevens, state senator
 Stephen Wright, air force veteran

Declined 

 David Wilson, state senator
 Glen Thompson, Ketchikan Gateway Borough Assemblyman

Results

Independents

Governor

Withdrew
 Bill Walker (Independent), incumbent governor

Lieutenant governor

Withdrew
 Byron Mallott (Democratic), incumbent lieutenant governor until October 16
Valerie Davidson (Independent), incumbent lieutenant governor since October 16

General election

Campaign
Independent candidate and incumbent governor Bill Walker announced on October 19 that he was suspending his campaign and endorsing Mark Begich, three days after Walker's running mate and incumbent lieutenant governor Byron Mallott resigned from office (and amid low polling numbers just three weeks before election day). However, Walker and Mallott still remained on the ballot as the deadline to withdraw was on September 4.

Debates

Predictions

Endorsements

Polling
with Bill Walker (campaign suspended), Mike Dunleavy, and Mark Begich

with Mark Begich and Mike Dunleavy

with Bill Walker and Mike Dunleavy

with Bill Walker and Mark Begich

Results

Notes

References

External links
Candidates at Vote Smart
Candidates at Ballotpedia

Official gubernatorial campaign websites
Mark Begich (D) for Governor
Mike Dunleavy (R) for Governor

Official lieutenant gubernatorial campaign websites
Kevin Meyer (R) for Lieutenant Governor

Alaska Division of Elections
Unofficial Election Results - Nov. 2018

Gubernatorial
2018
Alaska
Mark Begich